Zwijndrecht is a railway station in Zwijndrecht, Netherlands, located on the Breda–Rotterdam railway between Rotterdam and Dordrecht.

Zwijndrecht's first railway station was opened on 1 November 1872. In 1895 the station was relocated to the southeast, because the old location was not very convenient. The current railway building was constructed in 1965.

Train services
The following services call at Zwijndrecht:
4x per hour local service (sprinter) The Hague - Rotterdam - Dordrecht

Bus Services

 11
 12
 88
 92
 188
 717

Railway stations in South Holland
Railway stations opened in 1872
Railway stations on the Staatslijn I
Zwijndrecht, Netherlands